Lottovoittaja UKK Turhapuro is a Finnish 1976 comedy film written by Spede Pasanen and directed by Ere Kokkonen. It is the third film in the Uuno Turhapuro series. The film's title translates to "Lottery winner UKK Turhapuro", UKK being an apparent reference to former President of Finland Urho Kekkonen.

Plot

It is the first anniversary of Uuno (Vesa-Matti Loiri) and Elisabet (Marjatta Raita). Uuno has placed a bet with his friend Härski-Hartikainen (Spede Pasanen) a year ago, that if Uuno can take just one year of marriage with Elisabet, Hartikainen will treat him a festive dinner. However, Hartikainen buys a lottery ticket for Uuno, who agrees to deduct it from his debt – and the festive dinner is reduced to a can of milk and half a sausage. As it happens, Uuno becomes the lottery winner of 1.5 million marks, only to soon realize he doesn't own a single penny yet. Mister Tossavainen (Seppo Laine) arrives and offers to finance Uuno before he actually gets the jackpot. Thus, Uuno gets to live a rich live on credit. He buys a raccoon fur, leopard swimming trunks and a couple of Mercedes-Benzes. Women begin to fancy Uuno and so does his father-in-law (Tapio Hämäläinen). As time goes by it is revealed, though, that Uuno is not actually a lottery winner, and so he has to escape the anger of others to Härski's car repair shop.

External links

1976 films
Spede Pasanen
Finnish black-and-white films
1970s Finnish-language films